"Block Buster!" (also sometimes listed as "Blockbuster!") is a 1973 single by The Sweet. Written by Nicky Chinn and Mike Chapman, and produced by Phil Wainman, "Block Buster!" was the band's sole UK No. 1 hit. Released in January 1973, it spent five weeks at the top of the UK Singles Chart, and also made #1 in the Netherlands, Germany, Austria and Ireland, and #3 in Finland, Switzerland, Denmark and Norway. Outside Europe it peaked at #1 in New Zealand, #29 in Australia and at #73 on the American Billboard Hot 100.

Music and lyric
Its Muddy Waters-inspired blues riff is markedly similar to that featured on fellow RCA act David Bowie's "The Jean Genie", released shortly before, but all parties maintained this was a coincidence.

TV performances
Some controversy arose after the band's performance of the song on the British television program Top of the Pops on 25 December 1973, for which bassist Steve Priest wore a swastika arm band.

Charts

In the case of Belgium, there are two types of lists. The one for the Flemish speaking part of Belgium (Flanders) saw the song reach number two, for five consecutive weeks,. In the French speaking part (Wallonia) the song climbed to number one, for two consecutive weeks.

References

1973 singles
1973 songs
The Sweet songs
Dutch Top 40 number-one singles
Irish Singles Chart number-one singles
Number-one singles in New Zealand
Number-one singles in Austria
Number-one singles in Germany
UK Singles Chart number-one singles
Songs written by Mike Chapman
Songs written by Nicky Chinn
Song recordings produced by Phil Wainman
RCA Records singles
Glam rock songs